Bacher is a surname. Notable people with the surname include:

Adam Bacher (born 1973), South African cricketer
Ali Bacher (born 1942), South African cricketer and cricket official
Dominik Bacher (born 2002), German footballer
Edvard Bacher (1875–1961), Finnish Olympic sports shooter
Enrico Bacher (1940–2021), Italian ice hockey player who competed at the 1964 Winter Olympics
Gertrud Bacher (born 1971), Italian heptathlete
Ingrid Bachér (born 1930), pen name for Ingrid Erben, German writer
Julius Bacher (1810–1889), German playwright and novelist
Lutz Bacher (1943–2019), American artist
Mario Bacher (1941–2014), Italian ski mountaineer and cross-country skier
Michael Bacher (b. 1988) Italian footballer
Robert Bacher (1905–2004), American nuclear physicist
Sandra Bacher, wrestling champion and Olympic judo competitor
Simon Bacher (1823–1891), Hungarian poet
Tom Bacher, Danish badminton player
Wilhelm Bacher (1850–1913), Hungarian scholar, Orientalist, and linguist